The Galena Experiment is described as a period between 1807 and 1846 in the U.S. where the government granted mining permits to work a given area, and required workers to bring their ore to one of the officially licensed smelters, from whom the government collected 10% royalty. Initially, Federal revenues were enhanced; however, because of noncompliance on the sides of the miners, who evaded the licensed smelters; by the smelters, who did not pay the royalties; and the federal agents, who fraudulently sold mineral land at minimum prices as farmland, the system fell apart in the 1830s.

References

Mining in the United States
Federal government of the United States